Roqeh-ye Kabir (also Romanized as Roq‘eh-ye Kabīr; also known as Roq‘eh) is a village in Horjand Rural District, Kuhsaran District, Ravar County, Kerman Province, Iran. At the 2006 census, its population was 76, in 21 families.

References 

Populated places in Ravar County